Snaresbrook is a district of East London in the London Borough of Redbridge. It is located 8 miles east of Charing Cross.

The name derives from a corruption of Sayers brook, a tributary of the River Roding that flows through Wanstead to the East.

Snaresbrook is bounded approximately by South Woodford to the north, the lower reaches of Epping Forest and Upper Leytonstone, Leyton and Walthamstow to the west, Leytonstone to the south and Wanstead to the east. Snaresbrook Ward in the London Borough of Redbridge covers most of Wanstead High Street. The ward forms part of the 2007 parliamentary boundary changes and is currently entirely within the parliamentary constituency of Leyton and Wanstead (UK Parliament constituency).

Snaresbrook's most notable building is Snaresbrook Crown Court. It was opened in 1843 as the Wanstead Infant Orphan Asylum by King Leopold I of Belgium, and later became the Royal Wanstead School. It was designed by Sir George Gilbert Scott and William Bonython Moffatt.

Demography
According to the 2011 census, 57% of the population is White British, with the second and third largest ethnicities being Other White at 10% and Indian at 9%.

Education
Snaresbrook Primary is one of the schools in Snaresbrook.

Forest School was used in the filming of Never Let Me Go for the Hailsham assembly scenes.

Transport and locale
Nearest areas
 Wanstead
 Leytonstone
 Leyton
 Woodford
 Walthamstow

The nearest London Underground station is Snaresbrook on the Epping branch of the  Central line.

References

 "British History Reports"
 "The Parliamentary Constituencies (England) Order 2007"

Areas of London
Districts of the London Borough of Redbridge